Ladronellum is a genus of small air-breathing land snails, terrestrial pulmonate gastropod mollusks in the family Charopidae. This genus is only known to be observed in Guam.

Species
Species within the genus Ladronellum include:
 Ladronellum mariannarum

References

 
Charopidae
Taxonomy articles created by Polbot